A disk drive track is a circular path on the surface of a disk or diskette on which information is magnetically recorded and from which recorded information is read. 

A track is a physical division of data in a disk drive, as used in the Cylinder-Head-Record (CCHHR) addressing mode of a CKD disk. The concept is concentric, through the physical platters, being a data circle per each cylinder of the whole disk drive. In other words, the number of tracks on a single surface in the drive exactly equals the number of cylinders of the drive.

Tracks are subdivided into blocks (or sectors, pages) (see: Storage block and Virtual page).

The term track is sometimes prefaced with the word logical (i.e. "3390-9 has 3 logical tracks per physical track") to emphasize that it is used as an abstract concept, not a track in the physical sense.

See also 
 Hard disk drive
 Disk sector
 Cylinder

Computer storage devices
Rotating disc computer storage media